The Catherine River, a perennial river of the North-East Murray catchment of the Murray-Darling basin, is located in the Alpine region of Victoria, Australia. It flows Northwards in the Alpine National Park in the Australian Alps, joining with the Buffalo River in remote national park territory.

Location and features
The river flows generally north by east, all of its course through the remote national park before reaching its confluence with the Buffalo River within the Mount Buffalo National Park. The river descends  over its  course.

See also

References

North-East catchment
Rivers of Hume (region)
Alpine National Park